In mathematics, Jordan decomposition may refer to

 Hahn decomposition theorem, and the Jordan decomposition of a measure
 Jordan normal form of a matrix
 Jordan–Chevalley decomposition of a matrix
 Deligne–Lusztig theory, and its Jordan decomposition of a character of a finite group of Lie type
 The Jordan–Hölder theorem, about decompositions of finite groups.